The Fix is an American streaming television comedy panel show hosted by Jimmy Carr, starring D. L. Hughley and Katherine Ryan as team captains and Mona Chalabi as a statistician. The show premiered on December 14, 2018, on Netflix.

Premise
In The Fix, host Jimmy Carr and team captains D. L. Hughley and Katherine Ryan are joined by guest comics who in teams "debate and discuss" solutions to "one of the biggest challenges facing the world". With help from data expert Mona Chalabi, Chalabi will reveal "surprising, shocking and often hilarious" facts before each team propose their fix to the studio audience, who will in turn vote for their favorite fix.

Cast
 Jimmy Carr as Host
 D. L. Hughley as Team Captain
 Katherine Ryan as Team Captain
 Mona Chalabi as Correspondent and Statistician

Season 1

Release

Marketing
On November 16, 2018, the first trailer for the series was released.

References

External links
 
 

English-language Netflix original programming
2010s American comedy game shows
2018 American television series debuts
2018 American television series endings
Television series by Embassy Row (production company)